Thomas Simpson (13 August 1879 – 19 December 1961) was an English cricketer. Simpson was a left-handed batsman who bowled left-arm medium pace. He was born at Keyworth, Nottinghamshire.

Simpson made his first-class debut for Nottinghamshire against Yorkshire at Headingley in the 1903 County Championship. The following season he made two first-class appearances in the 1904 County Championship against Gloucestershire and Middlesex, while the following season he made a further two first-class appearances against the Marylebone Cricket Club and the touring Australians. He scored a total of 38 runs in his five matches, at an average of 5.42 and a high score of 14. With the ball he took 2 wickets at a bowling average of 42.50, with best figures of 1/28.

He died at Oldham, Lancashire on 19 December 1961.

References

External links
Thomas Simpson at ESPNcricinfo
Thomas Simpson at CricketArchive

1879 births
1961 deaths
People from Keyworth
Cricketers from Nottinghamshire
English cricketers
Nottinghamshire cricketers